Count  (August 13, 1909 – February 23, 1990), Riji of Hongō Gakue, who was the descendant of the feudal lord of the former Takamatsu Domain, served as the International Commissioner of the Boy Scouts of Japan as well as president of the Kagawa Scout Council. He was one of the original founders of Japanese Scouting in 1922.

Career 
Count Matsudaira, whose namesake was a daimyō of the late Edo period, the ninth lord of Takamatsu, was the 13th head of the Matsudaira family. He established a troop in Tokyo, now Gakushūin Group 1 in Toshima. He had an extended tour of the United States, during which he was a leader of the delegation of 22 Japanese Boy Scouts to the National Jamboree of the Boy Scouts of America, held at Irvine Ranch in southern California in July 1953 and later spent a month at the Schiff Scout Reservation in New Jersey attending the national training school for Scout executives. He also visited Arthur A. Schuck, the Chief Scout Executive at the national office of the Boy Scouts of America in New York City. In 1955, Kingsley C. Dassanaike worked to promote Scouting for the deaf and blind to Matsudaira, who would later found the Nippon Agoonoree based on their work together.

Awards and honors 
In 1981, Matsudaira was awarded the 149th Bronze Wolf, the only distinction of the World Organization of the Scout Movement, awarded by the World Scout Committee for exceptional services to world Scouting, at the 28th World Scout Conference. His son Yoritake Matsudaira received the award in 2012. In 1989 he also received the highest distinction of the Scout Association of Japan, the Golden Pheasant Award.

Ancestry

References

Dr. László Nagy, 250 Million Scouts, the World Scout Foundation and Dartnell Publishers, 1985, complete list through 1981

External links

Matsudaira Family Biography 
Matsudaira Clan on World Wizzy
Full list of Japanese Bronze Wolf recipients
Photo of Matsudaira with Hawaiian Boy Scout leaders
Japanese Lacquer, 1600-1900: Selections from the Charles A. Greenfield Collection, p.114
"Adults in Scouting" article on Matsudaira 

Recipients of the Bronze Wolf Award
1990 deaths
1909 births
Scouting in Japan